The Crystal Campground is located on Forest Road 177 in Ouachita National Forest, northeast of Norman, Arkansas.  The campground has nine campsites and a picnic shelter, and provides access to outdoor recreational activities including hiking, swimming, and fishing.  The swimming area is made possible by the Crystal Springs Dam, a  fieldstone dam built in 1935 by the Civilian Conservation Corps, that impounds Montgomery Creek to provide a swimming hole.  The campground's main picnic shelter was also built by the CCC at that time.  Both the dam and the shelter were listed on the National Register of Historic Places in 1993. The picnic shelter was knocked over by a falling tree.

See also
Collier Springs Picnic Area, further east on FR 177
National Register of Historic Places listings in Montgomery County, Arkansas

References

Park buildings and structures on the National Register of Historic Places in Arkansas
Government buildings completed in 1939
Campgrounds in the United States
Ouachita National Forest
Civilian Conservation Corps in Arkansas
National Register of Historic Places in Montgomery County, Arkansas
1939 establishments in Arkansas
Rustic architecture in Arkansas
Unused buildings in Arkansas
Picnic shelters